Flufenamic acid (FFA) is a member of the anthranilic acid derivatives (or fenamate) class of nonsteroidal anti-inflammatory drugs (NSAIDs).  Like other members of the class, it is a cyclooxygenase (COX) inhibitor, preventing the formation of prostaglandins. FFA is known to bind to and reduce the activity of prostaglandin F synthase and activate TRPC6. 

It is not widely used in humans as it has a high rate (30–60%) of gastrointestinal side effects.  It is generally not available in the US. It is available in some Asian and European countries as a generic drug.

Scientists led by Claude Winder from Parke-Davis invented FFA in 1963, along with fellow members of the class, mefenamic acid in 1961 and meclofenamic acid in 1964.

Although flufenamic acid was at one time informally referred to as "Fluffy" (see history cache), this pet name could also refer to flufenoxine.

References

Anthranilic acids
Trifluoromethyl compounds
GABAA receptor positive allosteric modulators
NMDA receptor antagonists